The Cheonghaejin-class ASR is a submarine rescue ship class of the Republic of Korea Navy. Only one ship has been built in her class, ROKS Cheonghaejin (ASR 21), in 1995. Its operations include rescuing trapped sailors in submarines, naval operation support for submarines, underwater research and mapping support, and recovery of sunk vessels.

Once all nine Son Wonil-class submarines are delivered to the Republic of Korea Navy, another ASR ship of the same class is planned to be built.

Notable operations
salvaged a North Korean  submarine in 1998
salvaged  #357 that was sunk during the naval clash in 2002 with North Korea

Auxiliary ships of the Republic of Korea Navy
Submarine rescue ships
Auxiliary search and rescue ship classes